Atractodenchelys robinsorum is an eel in the family Synaphobranchidae (cutthroat eels). It was described by Emma Stanislavovna Karmovskaya in 2003. It is a marine, deep water-dwelling eel which is known from the Chesterfield Islands in the southwestern Pacific Ocean. It is known to dwell at a depth of 710 metres.

References

Synaphobranchidae
Fish described in 2003